Barbadian singer and songwriter Rihanna has received multiple awards and nominations for her work in music, film, and fashion. Her music awards are predominantly in pop, R&B, and hip-hop genre categories.

Rihanna's first single, "Pon de Replay" led her to win five awards, following her achieving further accolades for both herself and her debut album, Music of the Sun (2005). Her second album, A Girl Like Me (2006), earned the singer more awards and nominations. Rihanna's third studio album, Good Girl Gone Bad (2007), became Rihanna's breakout album, with the singer receiving a string of awards and nominations in newer categories such as pop and R&B genres. The lead single, "Umbrella" earned Rihanna her first Grammy Award in 2008, while the album's singles and DVD earned a further eight nominations throughout 2008 and 2009. It was named 'Song of the Decade' at the Barbados Music Awards in 2010. Rated R (2009), Rihanna's fourth studio effort, produced the single "Rude Boy" which became the main provider of awards and nominations from the album. It was nominated for 'Song of the Year' at the MTV Europe Music Awards.

In 2010, Rihanna's collaboration with Jay-Z and Kanye West, "Run This Town" won Rihanna her second and third Grammy Awards for Best Rap Song and Best Rap/Sung Collaboration. Rihanna released her fifth studio album, Loud in 2010. It received many nominations including two Grammys for Album of the Year and Best Pop Vocal Album. Furthermore, its lead single, "Only Girl (In the World)" won Best Dance Recording, while the second single "What's My Name?" received a nomination in the same category. Also in 2011, Rihanna collaborated on the worldwide hit single "Love the Way You Lie" with Eminem. The song earned a string of nominations and awards including being nominated for six Billboard Music Awards and three Grammy Awards. Kanye West's single "All of the Lights", released in 2011 and featuring Rihanna as a credited artist, was nominated for three awards at the 2012 Grammy Awards, ultimately winning Best Rap Song and Best Rap/Sung Collaboration. Rihanna released her sixth studio album, Talk That Talk in 2011, earning the singer an American Music Award. Its lead single, "We Found Love" was nominated for many awards, most notably winning the MTV Video Music Award for Video of the Year in 2012 and Best Short Form Music Video at the 55th Grammy Awards in 2013. Two further releases from the album, the title track featuring Jay-Z and "Where Have You Been" also received Grammy nominations. Unapologetic (2012), Rihanna's seventh studio album, produced the lead single "Diamonds" which gained the singer several awards and nominations.

Rihanna has won 9 Grammy Awards, 12 Billboard Music Awards, 13 American Music Awards (including the Icon Award), and 7 MTV Video Music Awards (including the Michael Jackson Video Vanguard Award).

Academy Awards 
The Academy Awards are a set of awards given by the Academy of Motion Picture Arts and Sciences annually for excellence of cinematic achievements. Rihanna has received one nomination for her work on Black Panther: Wakanda Forever.

American Music Awards
The American Music Awards is an annual awards ceremony created by Dick Clark in 1973. Rihanna has received 13 awards from twenty-eight nominations, she's the third most awarded female artist ever. At the 2013 ceremony, Rihanna was honored with the first-ever "Icon" Award, an award that honors an artist whose body of work has made a profound influence over pop music on a global level. She holds the record for the most wins in Favorite Female Artist – Soul/R&B category of all time with seven wins.

ARIA Music Awards
The Australian Recording Industry Association Music Awards (commonly known as the ARIA Music Awards or ARIA Awards) is an annual series of award nights celebrating the Australian music industry, held by the Australian Recording Industry Association (ARIA). The event has been held annually since 1987. Rihanna has received one nomination.

BET Awards
The BET Awards were established in 2001 by the Black Entertainment Television network to celebrate Black Americans and other minorities in music, acting, sports, and other fields of entertainment over the past year. The awards are presented annually and broadcast live on BET. Rihanna has received six awards from twenty nine nominations.

BET Hip-Hop Awards

Billboard Awards

Billboard Music Awards
The Billboard Music Awards is sponsored by Billboard magazine and is held annually in December. The Billboard Year-End Charts Awards are based on sales data by Nielsen SoundScan and radio information by Nielsen Broadcast Data Systems. Rihanna has won 6 awards from 68 nominations.  Rihanna is amongst the artists with most wins in Billboard Music Awards history (13 awards, including the Billboard Chart Achievement Award).

Billboard Latin Music Awards
The Billboard Latin Music Awards is an awards programme charting the sales and radio airplay success of musical recordings on the Billboard charts. Rihanna has earned three nominations and won one of the five.

Billboard Touring Awards
Established in 2004, the Billboard Touring Awards is an annual meeting sponsored by Billboard magazine which also honors the top international live entertainment industry artists and professionals. Rihanna has earned one nomination.

Black Reel Awards

BMI Awards

BMI London Awards

BMI Pop Awards

BMI R&B/Hip-Hop Awards

BMI Urban Awards

Bravo Otto Awards
The Bravo Otto Awards is a German accolade honoring excellence of performers in film, television and music. Established in 1957, the award is presented annually, with winners selected by the readers of Bravo magazine. The award is presented in gold, silver and bronze and, since 1996, an honorary platinum statuette presented for lifetime achievement. Rihanna received three awards.

BRIT Awards
The BRIT Awards are the British Phonographic Industry's annual pop music awards. Rihanna has won two awards from eight nominations.

BT Digital Music Awards
The BT Digital Music Awards (DMA) were created in the UK in 2001 and are held annually. Rihanna has earned one award from three nominations.

Canadian Radio Music Awards

CFDA Fashion Awards
The Council of Fashion Designers of America (CFDA), often called "the Oscars of fashion", is an annual award ceremony, which honors excellence in fashion design. Rihanna received the Fashion Icon Award in 2014.

!
|-
!scope="row"|2014
|Rihanna
|Fashion Icon Award
|
|style="text-align:center;"|

Clio Awards
The Clio Awards is an annual award program that recognizes innovation and creative excellence in advertising, design and communication, as judged by an international panel of advertising professionals.

Critics' Choice Awards

Danish Music Awards

DiscussingFilm Critic Awards

ECHO Awards
The ECHO Awards are a German music award show created in 1992. Each year's winner is determined by the previous year's sales. Rihanna has received four nominations.

The Fashion Awards
The Fashion Awards is a ceremony held annually in the United Kingdom since 1989 to showcase both British and international individuals and businesses who have made the most outstanding contributions to the fashion industry during the year. Rihanna has received one award from two nominations.

FiFi Awards
The FiFi Awards are an annual event sponsored by The Fragrance Foundation which honor the fragrance industry's creative achievements and is the most prominent and prestigious celebratory event of the fragrance industry. Rihanna received one award.

Footwear News Achievement Awards
Footwear News Achievement Awards, established 1986, is an annual "Shoe Oscars" hosted by Footwear News and is considered the industry bible for footwear. Rihanna received one award.

GAFFA Awards

GAFFA Awards (Denmark) 
Delivered since 1991. The GAFFA Awards (Danish: GAFFA Prisen) are a Danish award that rewards popular music awarded by the magazine of the same name.

GAFFA Awards (Sweden) 
Delivered since 2010. The GAFFA Awards (Swedish: GAFFA Priset) are a Swedish award that rewards popular music awarded by the magazine of the same name.

Gaygalan Awards 
Since 1999, the Gaygalan Awards are a Swedish accolade presented by the QX magazine.

Glamour Magazine Women of the Year Awards

Golden Raspberry Award

Grammy Awards
The Grammy Awards are awarded annually by the National Academy of Recording Arts and Sciences. Rihanna is the female artist with the most wins in the Best Rap/Sung Collaboration category (5 wins). She has won 9 awards from 33 nominations.

Golden Globe Awards 
The Golden Globe Awards are accolades bestowed by the Hollywood Foreign Press Association beginning in January 1944, recognizing excellence in both American and international film and television.

Guinness World Records

Harvard Foundation for Interracial and Cultural Relations

!
|-
|2017
|Rihanna
|Humanitarian of the Year
|
|
|}

The Headies
The Headies (originally called the Hip Hop World Awards) is a music awards show established in 2006 by Hip Hop World Magazine of Nigeria to recognize outstanding achievements in the Nigerian music industry.

|-
|2013
|"Orezi"
|Best Reggae/Dancehall Single
|

Hollywood Critics Association Creative Arts Awards

Hollywood Music in Media Awards

IFPI Hong Kong Top Sales Music Award

iHeartRadio Music Awards
The iHeartRadio Music Awards is an American music awards show which debuted in 2014. Rihanna has won 8 awards from 25 nominations, being the second most awarded female act only behind Taylor Swift.

iHeartRadio Titanium Awards 
iHeartRadio Titanium Awards are awarded to an artist when their song reaches 1 Billion Spins across iHeartRadio Stations.

Japan Gold Disc Awards

Juno Awards
Juno Awards are presented annually to Canadian musical artists and bands to acknowledge their artistic and technical achievements in all aspects of music. Winners are currently chosen by members of the Canadian Academy of Recording Arts and Sciences or, depending on the award, a panel of experts. In almost all of the main general categories, such as Album of the Year or Artist of the Year, nominees are determined by sales during the qualifying period; in genre-specific categories, they are determined by panel. Rihanna has one award from three nominations.

La Chanson de l'année
La Chanson de l'année (translated to Song of the Year in English) is a ceremony of awards which takes place every year in France. Rihanna has received one nomination.

Latin American Music Awards

Las Vegas Film Critics Society

Los Premios 40 Principales
Los Premios 40 Principales is an award show by the musical radio station Los 40 Principales. Rihanna has earned one award from seven nominations.

Meteor Ireland Music Awards

MOBO Awards
The Music of Black Origin, MOBO Awards, were established in 1995 by Kanya King MBE and Andy Ruffell. They are held annually in the United Kingdom to recognize artists of any race or nationality performing black music. Rihanna has received three awards from seven nominations.

MP3 Music Awards

MTV Awards

MTV Movie Awards 
The MTV Movie Awards were established in 1992 and is a film awards show presented annually on MTV.

MTV Video Music Awards
The MTV Video Music Awards, also called the VMAs and debuted in 1984, is an award show by the cable network MTV to celebrate the top music videos of the year. Rihanna has won five awards (including the Michael Jackson Video Vanguard Award). She is the youngest artist to win the Video of the Year Award twice.

MTV Video Music Awards Japan
The MTV Video Music Awards Japan are the Japanese version of the MTV Video Music Awards. Rihanna has received 2 awards (Best New Artist in a Video for "Pon de Replay" in 2006 and Best R&B video for "Only Girl (In the World)" in 2011. Nominations from shows before 2009 are not listed.

MTV Europe Music Awards
The MTV Europe Music Awards "(EMA)" were established in 1994 by MTV Networks Europe to celebrate the most popular music videos in Europe. Originally beginning as an alternative to the American MTV Video Music Awards, the MTV Europe Music Awards is today a popular celebration of what MTV viewers consider the best in music. Rihanna has won 4 awards from 30 nominations.

MTV Africa Music Awards
The MTV Africa Music Awards (also known as the MAMAs) were established in 2008 by MTV Networks Africa as the African version of the Video Music Awards and to celebrate the most popular music in Africa. Rihanna has received four nominations.

MTV Video Music Brasil

MTV Platinum Video Plays Awards

MTV O Music Awards

mtvU Woodie Awards

MTV Millennial Awards

MTV Italian Music Awards
Firstly called TRL Awards, since 2012 it is presented by MTV Italy changing the name in MTV Italian Music Awards.

MuchMusic Video Awards
The MuchMusic Video Awards (MMVAs) is an annual award show presented by the Canadian music video channel MuchMusic to honour the year's best music videos. Rihanna has earned three awards from 18 nominations.

MYX Music Awards

NAACP Image Awards
The NAACP Image Awards are awards presented annually by the American National Association for the Advancement of Colored People to honor outstanding people of color in film, television, music, and literature. Rihanna has received ten nominations and three wins.

NME Awards
The NME Awards is an annual music awards show in the United Kingdom, founded by the music magazine, NME (New Musical Express). The first awards show was held in 1953 as the NME Poll Winners Concerts, shortly after the founding of the magazine. Though the accolades given are entirely genuine, the ceremony itself is usually carried out in a humorous and jovial manner.

NRJ Music Awards
The NRJ Music Awards, created in 2000 by the French radio station NRJ, give out awards to popular musicians by different categories. Rihanna has six awards and sixteen nominations.

Nickelodeon Awards

Nickelodeon Kids' Choice Awards
The Nickelodeon Kids' Choice Awards is an annual awards show, that honors the year's biggest television, movie, and music acts, as voted by the people.

Nickelodeon Australian Kids' Choice Awards
The Nickelodeon Australian Kids' Choice Awards is an annual awards show which awards entertainers with a blimp trophy, as voted by kids. The ceremony was discontinued after 2011 and replaced with the SlimeFest from 2012.

Nickelodeon Kids' Choice Awards UK
The Nickelodeon Kids' Choice Awards UK, also known as the KCAs, is an annual awards show, similar to the American and Australian versions.

Premios Oye!
Premios Oye! is an annual awards ceremony that award outstanding achievements in the Mexican record industry.

People's Choice Awards
The People's Choice Awards is an awards show recognizing the people and the work of popular culture. Rihanna has 8 awards from 14 nominations.

Radio Disney Music Awards
The Radio Disney Music Awards is an annual awards show by Radio Disney. The awards honor the year's biggest achievements in music, voted by teen viewers.

Satellite Awards 
The Satellite Awards is an award ceremony honoring the year's outstanding performers, films and television shows, presented by the International Press Academy.

Soul Train Music Awards
The Soul Train Music Awards is an annual award show which previously aired in national television syndication, and honors the best in Black music and entertainment. It is produced by the makers of Soul Train, the program from which it takes its name. Rihanna has earned three awards from 19 nominations.

Swiss Music Awards

Teen Choice Awards
The Teen Choice Awards is a teen awards show presented annually by Fox. The program honors the year's biggest achievements in music, movies, sports, television, fashion and more, as voted on by teens aged 13–19.

Telehit Awards

The Radio Academy Awards 
The Radio Academy awards a number of honors each year, including induction into its UK Radio Hall of Fame, Fellowships, The John Peel Award for Outstanding Contribution to Music Radio, The PPL Lifetime Achievement Award, The Local and Regional Lifetime Achievement Award and The Most Played Artist on British Radio.

4Music Video Honours

Urban Music Awards
The Urban Music Awards is a hip-hop, R&B, dance and soul music awards ceremony launched in 2003 and now held in six countries annually. Rihanna has earned three awards from seven nominations.

UK Festival Awards

UK Music Video Awards

VH1 Soul VIBE Awards

WDM Radio Awards
The WDM Radio Awards is an award ceremony created in 2017 by Los 40 under their World Dance Music brand, billed as "the first radio awards to electronic music". It is meant to be a global event, promoted by the twelve Los 40 stations in Spain and Latin America.

Webby Award
The Webby Award is an award for excellence on the Internet presented annually by The International Academy of Digital Arts and Sciences. Categories include websites, interactive advertising, online film and video, and mobile. Rihanna received two awards.

World Music Awards
The World Music Awards is an international awards show founded in 1989 that annually honors recording artists based on worldwide sales figures provided by the International Federation of the Phonographic Industry (IFPI). Rihanna has earned five awards.

YouTube Music Awards
The YouTube Music Awards, abbreviated as the YTMA, was the inaugural music award show presented by YouTube.

Notes

References

Rihanna
Awards